Charles Lumbahe-Kahudi (born 19 July 1986) is a Congolese-French professional basketball player who plays for ASVEL of the LNB Pro A.

Professional career
In his pro career, Kahudi has played with the following clubs: Cholet Basket, Évreux Basket, JDA Dijon, Le Mans, and ASVEL Basket.

French national team
Kahudi has represented the senior men's French national basketball team at the EuroBasket 2011, EuroBasket 2013, and EuroBasket 2015. He also played at the 2014 FIBA Basketball World Cup, and the 2016 Summer Olympics.

Honours

Club
ASVEL
LNB Pro A: 2015–16
Le Mans Sarthe Basket
French Leaders Cup: 2014

Individual
LNB All-Star (3): 2011, 2012, 2013
LNB Pro A Best Defender: 2016

References

External links
 Charles Kahudi at EuroCup
 Charles Kahudi at  FIBA Europe
 Charles Kahudi at Eurobasket.com
 Charles Kahudi at French League 
 
 
 

1986 births
Living people
2014 FIBA Basketball World Cup players
ALM Évreux Basket players
ASVEL Basket players
Basketball players at the 2016 Summer Olympics
Black French sportspeople
Cholet Basket players
Democratic Republic of the Congo emigrants to France
Democratic Republic of the Congo men's basketball players
French men's basketball players
JDA Dijon Basket players
Le Mans Sarthe Basket players
Olympic basketball players of France
Small forwards
Basketball players from Kinshasa